Tutrakan Municipality is a municipality (obshtina) in Silistra Province, Northeastern Bulgaria, located along the right bank of Danube river in the Danubian Plain. It is named after its administrative centre - the town of Tutrakan.

The municipality embraces a territory of 448.35 km² with a population of 16,920 inhabitants, as of December 2009.

The main road 21 crosses the area from east to west, connecting the province centre of Silistra with the city of Ruse.

Settlements 

Tutrakan Municipality includes the following 15 places (towns are shown in bold):

Demography 
The following table shows the change of the population during the last four decades.

Ethnic groups 
Ethnic Bulgarians constitute the largest ethnic group in Tutrakan Municipality, followed by ethnic Turks and Roma people.

Religion
According to the latest Bulgarian census of 2011, the religious composition, among those who answered the optional question on religious identification, was the following:

See also
Provinces of Bulgaria
Municipalities of Bulgaria
List of cities and towns in Bulgaria

References

External links
 Official website 

Municipalities in Silistra Province